Binaa Sudan Party, abbreviated BSP, is a political party in Sudan. Established February 2018 following an invitation from the Sudanese Shadow Government, a group of youth professionals who joined together to form a non-ideological organisation to produce a practical manifesto to put solutions for Sudan's state problems. Binaa Sudan Party is a Transpartisan organization. BSP has signed the Deceleration of Freedom and Change, which is an alliance that initiated and led the topple of Omar Al-Bashir in 2019.

History 
The Sudanese Shadow Government is a political organization which announced its establishment on 24 December 2013 in Khartoum, Sudan. After 5 years of attempting to reform the political environment in Sudan, it called for establishing a new political party to lead the change in political agenda, aiming to stop the ideology based conflict to shift the political competition towards addressing citizens' problems and concerns.

Ideology 
Binaa Sudan Party seeks to transcend traditional political boundaries to be a Transpartisan organization.

Electoral history 
There has been no elections in Sudan since the establishment of the party.

References

Political parties in Sudan